Frankfield is a rural locality in the Isaac Region, Queensland, Australia.

History 
On 17 May 2019, it was decided to discontinue the locality of Mistake Creek and absorb its land into the neighbouring localities of Clermont, Laglan, Frankfield and Peak Vale.

References 

Isaac Region
Localities in Queensland